The Jāmeh Mosque of Borujerd ( – Masjid-e-Jāmeh Borujerd) is a congregational mosque (Jāmeh) in Borujerd, in the province of Loristan, western Iran. The mosque is the oldest mosque in the Zagros area and western Iran. It ranks as No. 228 in the Inventory of National Artefacts of Iran.

The mosque located in the old district of Borujerd city previously called Do Dangeh. Jameh Mosque of Borujerd was built on an ancient fire-temple of the pre-Islamic Sassanid dynasty.

History 

The construction of this mosque is attributed to a certain Hamuyeh, or Hamuleh, said to have been appointed by the Abi-Dolaf rulers as the governor of Borujerd in the 3rd century A.H. (9th century CE). Judging by the evidences, continuous works of construction, reconstruction and restoration within the perimeter of the Jameh mosque of Borujerd are confirmed ever since the 3rd century up to the present; the culmination of this activity occurring in the Seljuk period. The architectural works done here in the 4th and 5th centuries have been compared – owing to the execution of the main pillars, the round based pseudo-columns, the brick decorations – to the mausoleum of Amir Esma’il the Samanid in Bukhara. The plan of the mosque's dome chamber and that of its secondary aisles at the corners of the perimeter have been likened to those of Heidaryyah Qazvin and the Jameh Mosque of Golpayegan. Assuming seven periods of restoration and essential repair, it is said that the most ancient part of the ensemble is its principle dome construction, now surrounded by adjunctions of later periods.

The portico and minarets of the Jameh mosque are said to have been built in 1209 AH (1794/5 CE), as an adjunction to its lofty arch built under Ma’mun and Mo’tassem. The religious and poetic inscriptions visible upon the entrance arch and on the wooden minbar and door of the mosque speak of these architectural alterations in the course of history.

This mosque has two entrances, on its eastern and western sides. The interior façade of the dome-covered space, beside the architectural adjunction made in various periods, incorporates refined decorations, including an exquisite epigraph on the southern wall, above the mihrab. Beside the majesty and importance of this building and the delicacy of its architectural fabric, a note must be made of the mosque's nine-stepped minbar, of particular importance. It was crafted by carpenter Dervish Yar-Muhammad upon an order from the Safavid king Shah Abbas II, and bears a poetic epigraph the last diptych of which gives, in Abjad figures, the construction date of the minbar [1069 AH = 1658/9 AD]. On the western entrance door, two other diptychs are carved, which beside the construction date of the mosque [1092 AH], gives the name of its builder.

Jameh mosque has been used as a religious, trading and social affair centre. The complex includes the Jameh Mosque used for Friday Prayer and public gatherings, Gharib Khaneh (an asylum for the poor and invalids), a Hammam (public bathhouse), a field and an Ab-Anbar (underground water storehouse). Most of these facilities have already been destroyed or replaced with modern streets and shops.

The mosque was bombed by Iraqi planes in the 1980s and was damaged by rain and earthquakes. The 2006 Borujerd earthquake ruined its minarets and damaged it vastly. However, it is still tourist attraction in Loristan and western Iran.

See also 
 List of mosques in Iran
 Soltani Mosque of Borujerd

Further reading

External links

 Borujerd Information Portal
 Imam Reza Network

9th-century mosques
Mosques in Iran
Mosque buildings with domes
Buildings and structures in Lorestan Province
Tourist attractions in Lorestan Province
Borujerd
National works of Iran
Borujerd